Jajce is a town and municipality located in the Central Bosnia Canton of the Federation of Bosnia and Herzegovina, an entity of Bosnia and Herzegovina. According to the 2013 census, the town has a population of 7,172 inhabitants, with 27,258 inhabitants in the municipality. It is situated in the region of Bosanska Krajina, on the crossroads between Banja Luka, Mrkonjić Grad and Donji Vakuf, on the confluence of the rivers Pliva and Vrbas.

History

Ancient times

Jajce Mithraeum is a temple dedicated to the God of the Sun, Mithra. The god was worshiped and the cult spread to other parts of the Roman Empire throughout the Mediterranean basin by slaves and merchants from the Orient, and by Roman soldiers who came into contact with the followers of the cult in the East. The temple is dated to the 2nd century AD and was repaired sometime during the 4th century AD. This particular Mithraeum is renowned as one of the best preserved in Europe. It was discovered accidentally during the construction of a private house. The temple is protected by glass walls so that visitors can see inside even without entering the facility. However, for entry and a closer look, visitors need to give notice of their visit in advance by contacting the Ethnological Museum of Jajce.

The Jajce Mithraeum has been declared a National Monument of Bosnia and Herzegovina.

Bosnian Kingdom

Hrvoje Vukčić Hrvatinić at the time of the largest power establish the town of Jajce.
Jajce was first built in the 14th century and served as the capital of the independent Kingdom of Bosnia during its time. The first references to the name of Jajce in written sources is from the year 1396, but the fortress had already existed by then. The town has gates as fortifications, as well as a castle with walls which lead to the various gates around the town. About 10–20 kilometres from Jajce lies the Komotin Castle and town area which is older but smaller than Jajce. It is believed the town of Jajce was established after Komotin was struck by Black Death.
Jajce was the residence of the last Bosnian king Stjepan Tomašević, where he was slain.

The Ottomans besieged the town and executed Tomašević, but held it only for six months. At this point it was the Hungarians who looked to seize the opportunity to hinder the Ottoman expansion in the Balkans. With the Bosnian King's death opportunity opened for Hungarian King Matthias Corvinus to try and capture Bosnia before Ottomans, which consequentially lead to Siege of Jajce and suppression of Ottoman forces advancement. This derailed Ottoman plans for nearly half of century, for which time Hungarians established the Banovina of Jajce. Before her death in 1478 Queen Catherine restored the Saint Mary's Church in Jajce, today the oldest church in town.

Ottoman period
Skenderbeg Mihajlović besieged Jajce again in 1501, which, although siege was unsuccessful, marked approaching demise of the town and Hungarian rule in Bosnia. Mihajlović was repelled by Ivaniš Korvin, who was assisted by Zrinski, Frankopan, Karlović and Cubor.in 1520 Petar Keglević became Ban of Jajce.
In 1527, Jajce fell to the Ottoman rule. Under the Ottomans, town lost its strategic importance, as the border moved further North.

There are several churches and mosques built at different times during different rules, making Jajce a rather diverse town in this aspect.

Austria-Hungary period
Jajce passed with the rest of Bosnia and Herzegovina under the administration of Austria-Hungary in 1878. The Franciscan monastery of Saint Luke was completed in 1885.

World War II

From 1929–1941, Jajce was part of the Vrbas Banovina of the Kingdom of Yugoslavia. 
During the Second World War, Jajce gained importance as centre of a large swath of free territory, and on 29 November 1943 it hosted the second convention of the Anti-Fascist Council of National Liberation of Yugoslavia (AVNOJ). There, representatives from throughout Yugoslavia decided to establish a federal Yugoslavia in equality of its nations, and established that Bosnia and Herzegovina would be one of its constitutive Republics. The post-war economy of Jajce in socialist times was based on industry and tourism.

At the beginning of the Bosnian War, Jajce was inhabited by people from all ethnic groups, and was situated at a junction between areas of Serb majority to the north, Bosnian Muslim majority areas to the south-east and Croatian majority areas to the south-west.

Bosnian war

At the end of April and the beginning of May 1992, almost all ethnic Serbs left and fled or were expelled to territory under Republika Srpska control. In the summer of 1992, the Army of Republika Srpska (VRS) started heavy bombardment of the town. Jajce was defended by Croat (HVO) and Bosniak (ARBiH) forces with two separate command lines, fell to Serb forces on 29 October. Retreating forces were joined by a column of 30,000 to 40,000 civilian refugees, stretching  towards Travnik, under VRS sniping and shelling. Shrader defined it as "the largest and most wretched single exodus" of the Bosnian War.

Bosniak refugees re-settled in Central Bosnia, while Croats moved either to Croatia or closer to the Croatian border due to rising tensions. By November 1992 the pre-war population of Jajce had shrunk from 45,000 to just several thousand.

In the following weeks, all mosques and Catholic churches in Jajce were demolished. It is presumed that the Orthodox Church was demolished on 10–11 October by members of the so-called "Krajina Brigade" within the Army of BiH. The VRS converted the town's Franciscan monastery into a prison and its archives, museum collections and artworks were looted; the monastery church was completely destroyed. By 1992, all religious buildings in Jajce had been destroyed, save for two mosques whose perilous positioning on a hilltop had made them unsuitable for demolition.

Jajce was liberated together with Bosanski Petrovac in mid-September 1995 during Operation Mistral 2 by the Croatian Defence Council (HVO), after VRS forces had evacuated the Serb population. Jajce became part of the Federation of Bosnia and Herzegovina according to the Dayton Agreement. Returning Bosniaks were at start blocked by a mob of Croats in early August 1996, which according to US diplomat Robert Gelbard was personally directed by convicted Bosnian Croat war criminal Dario Kordić. Bosniak refugees could return peacefully only few weeks after, being followed by many more. Dario Kordić surrendered and was flown to the Hague following political pressure on Zagreb, particularly by the United States.

A significant number of Serb refugees settled in Brčko while the rest settled in Mrkonjić Grad, Šipovo, and Banja Luka.

Economy and tourism 
 

The economy of the Jajce municipality is nowadays weak. UNESCO, with a Swedish organisation Kulturarv utan gränser, initiated project of renovation of the historical core of the town. The main project of the company was to renovate an old traditional houses which symbolize the panoramic view of the town with the waterfall. As of 2006, most of the houses were rebuilt.

The old Jajce walled city core, including the waterfall, and other individual sites outside the walled city perimeter, such as the Jajce Mithraeum, is designated as The natural and architectural ensemble of Jajce and proposed for inscription into the UNESCO's World Heritage Site list. The bid for inscription is currently placed on the UNESCO Tentative list.

Tourism
Jajce was a popular tourist destination in Yugoslav times, mostly due to the historical importance of the AVNOJ session. Tourism has restarted, and its numbers (20-55,000 tourists in 2012–2013) are relevant in relation to the municipality's population (25,000). Tourists from across the former Yugoslavia still make up most of the visitors to Jajce, but Middle Eastern tourists have also increased since the early 2000s; organised school trips also are a significant portion of tourists. Spring and autumn are the main tourist seasons.

It was damaged during the Bosnian War by high waters and severe flooding, as the area of Jajce-1 Hydroelectric Power Station intake was at the battlefront and out of service; the sudden rise in water level and discharge created a tidal wave which damaged the travertine body of the waterfall.

Jajce is situated in the mountains; there is beautiful countryside near the town, rivers such as the Vrbas and Pliva, and lakes such as Pliva lake, which is also a popular destination for the local people and tourists. Not far from Jajce there are mountains that are over 2,000 metres high, such as Vlašić near the town of Travnik. Travelling through the mountain roads to the town may not be pleasant for some visitors, because the roads are in poor condition, but the scenery is picturesque.

Demographics
In 1931 today's municipality of Jajce was part of the much bigger Jajce County (together with today's municipalities of Jezero, Dobretići and Šipovo).

266 Serbs from Jajce are documented to have been murdered at the Jasenovac concentration camp during World War II.

Population

Ethnic composition

Climate

Settlements

Notable people
Mato Jajalo (born 1988), footballer
Marin Leovac (born 1988), footballer
Irfan Škiljan (born 1973), computer scientist, author of the IrfanView program

Twin towns – sister cities

Jajce is twinned with:

 Alaçatı (Çeşme), Turkey
 Hallsberg, Sweden
 Kutná Hora, Czech Republic
 Ottensheim, Austria
 Piacenza, Italy
 Szekszárd, Hungary
 Tomislavgrad, Bosnia and Herzegovina
 Virovitica, Croatia
 Zenica, Bosnia and Herzegovina

References

External links

Everything about Jajce
Image of Town and Waterfall
Official Website
Tourism in Jajce
Agency for Cultural, Historical and Natural Heritage and Development of Tourist Potential of Town Jajce
Tragovima bosanskog kraljevstva  - Tourist route for medieval Bosnia (English)
Trail of the Bosnian Kingdom - Cultural Tourism in Jajce

Populated places in Jajce
Populated places established in the 14th century
Cities and towns in the Federation of Bosnia and Herzegovina
 
National Monuments of Bosnia and Herzegovina
World Heritage Tentative List for Bosnia and Herzegovina
14th-century establishments in Bosnia and Herzegovina
Medieval Bosnia and Herzegovina architecture
Jajce